Florea Voicilă (born 1 January 1954) is a Romanian former football forward and manager. He spent most of his playing career in the Romanian lower leagues, with only two short spells in the first league at Rapid București and Chimia Râmnicu Vâlcea, scoring about 465 goals throughout his career. After he retired from playing football, Voicilă worked as a manager in the Romanian lower leagues, president at FCM Alexandria and as a local councilor of Alexandria. His sons Dănuț Narcis and Ionuț Florin were also footballers, the first one managed to play in the first league, being also a manager in the Romanian lower leagues and the second one played only in the Romanian lower leagues.

International career
Florea Voicilă played two friendly games at international level for Romania, earning his caps while playing in the second division for Automatica Alexandria. He made his debut under coach Ștefan Kovács when he came as a substitute and replaced Mihai Zamfir in the 83rd minute of a 2–1 loss against Greece. He also played in a 1–1 against Israel when he came as a substitute and replaced Nicolae Dobrin in the 56th minute.

Honours

Player
Rulmentul Alexandria
Divizia C: 1973–74, 1997–98

References

1954 births
Living people
Romanian footballers
Romania international footballers
Association football forwards
Liga I players
Liga II players
Liga III players
FC Rapid București players
Chimia Râmnicu Vâlcea players
Romanian football managers
Romanian sports executives and administrators